In the military of classical antiquity, a clipeus (Ancient Greek: ἀσπίς) was a large shield worn by the Greek hoplites and Romans as a piece of defensive armor, which they carried upon the arm, to protect them from the blows of their enemies. It was round in shape and in the middle was a bolt of iron, or of some other metal, with a sharp point. The clipeus was more-or-less identical to the earlier aspis.

Decorative use

Pliny the Elder also describes the custom of having a bust-portrait of an ancestor painted on a clipeus, and having it hung in a temple or other public place.  From this round bas-reliefs in a medallion on sarcophagi and in other forms are known as "clipeus portraits".

Roman use
The clipeus was used by Romans during the Roman Kingdom and early republic but was replaced by the legionary scutum, a convex rectangular shield, in the later Roman Republic. However, the scutum disappeared during the Crisis of the Third Century. All troops adopted the auxiliary oval (and sometimes round or hexagonal) shield (parma or clipeus). Shields, from examples found at Dura-Europos and Nydam Mose, were of vertical plank construction, the planks glued, and faced inside and out with painted leather.  The edges of the shield were bound with stitched rawhide, which shrank as it dried, improving structural cohesion.  It was also lighter than the edging of copper alloy used in earlier Roman shields.

The clipeus virtutis, Latin for "shield of bravery", was awarded to Augustus for his "courage, clemency, justice and piety" by the senate and displayed in the Curia Julia.

See also
 Imago clipeata
 Peltarion
 Parma

Notes

References
 
 
 Hall, James. A History of Ideas and Images in Italian Art, John Murray, London, 1983, p. 78.

Further reading
 William Smith, D.C.L., LL.D. "Clipeus". A Dictionary of Greek and Roman Antiquities. John Murray, London, 1875.

Personal weapons
Ancient weapons
Ancient Greek military equipment
Ancient Roman military equipment
Roman shields
Greek shields